Metrosideros excelsa, commonly known as pōhutukawa, New Zealand Christmas tree, New Zealand Christmas bush, and iron tree, is a coastal evergreen tree in the myrtle family, Myrtaceae, that produces a brilliant display of red (or occasionally orange, yellow or white) flowers, each consisting of a mass of stamens. The pōhutukawa is one of twelve Metrosideros species endemic to New Zealand. Renowned for its vibrant colour and its ability to survive even perched on rocky, precarious cliffs, it has found an important place in New Zealand culture for its strength and beauty, and is regarded as a chiefly tree by Māori.

Etymology
The species name excelsa is from Latin , "highest, sublime".  is a Māori word. Its closest equivalent in other Polynesian languages is the Cook Island Māori word , referring to a coastal shrub with white berries, Sophora tomentosa.

Description

They usually grow as a multi-trunked spreading tree. Their trunks and branches are sometimes festooned with matted, fibrous aerial roots. The oblong, leathery leaves are covered in dense white hairs underneath.

The tree flowers from November to January with a peak in early summer (mid to late December), with brilliant crimson flowers covering the tree, hence the nickname New Zealand Christmas tree. There is variation between individual trees in the timing of flowering, and in the shade and brightness of the flowers. In isolated populations genetic drift has resulted in local variation: many of the trees growing around the Rotorua lakes produce pink-shaded flowers, and the yellow-flowered cultivar 'Aurea' descends from a pair discovered in 1940 on Mōtītī Island in the Bay of Plenty.

Distribution

The natural range of pōhutukawa is the coastal regions of the North Island of New Zealand, north of a line stretching from New Plymouth (39° S) to Gisborne (38° S), where it once formed a continuous coastal fringe. By the 1990s, pastoral farming and introduced pests had reduced pōhutukawa forests by over 90%. It also occurs naturally on the shores of lakes in the Rotorua area and in Abel Tasman National Park at the top of South Island.

The tree is renowned as a cliff-dweller, able to maintain a hold in precarious, near-vertical situations.

Iconic pōhutukawa

A pōhutukawa tree with an estimated age of 180 years known as 'Te Hā,' is fully established at an Auckland City park. 'Te Hā' is the largest urban specimen in the country. Plans to build a monument in honour of victims of the Erebus Disaster in proximity to the tree activated significant local opposition in 2021.

Conservation

In New Zealand, pōhutukawa are under threat from browsing by the introduced common brushtail possum which strips the tree of its leaves. A charitable conservation trust, Project Crimson, has the aim of reversing the decline of pōhutukawa and other Metrosideros species – its mission statement is "to enable pōhutukawa and rata to flourish again in their natural habitat as icons in the hearts and minds of all New Zealanders".

Uses 
Pōhutukawa wood is dense, strong and highly figured. Māori used it for beaters and other small, heavy items. It was frequently used in shipbuilding, since the naturally curvy shapes made strong knees. Extracts are used in traditional Māori healing for the treatment of diarrhoea, dysentery, sore throat and wounds.

Cultivation
Pōhutukawa are popular in cultivation, and there are fine examples in most North Island coastal cities. Vigorous and easy to grow, the tree flourishes well south of its natural range, and has naturalised in the Wellington area and in the north of the South Island. It has also naturalised on Norfolk Island to the north. Pōhutukawa have been introduced to other countries with mild-to-warm climates, including south-eastern Australia, where it is naturalising on coastal cliffs near Sydney. In coastal California, it is a popular street and lawn tree, but has caused concern in San Francisco where its root systems are blamed for destroying sewer lines and sidewalks. In parts of South Africa, pōhutukawa grow so well that they are regarded as an invasive species. The Spanish city of A Coruña has adopted the pōhutukawa as a floral emblem.

At least 39 cultivars of pōhutukawa have been released. Duncan & Davies nurseries were a leading force in the mid-20th century, while the late Graeme Platt has been responsible for 16 different cultivars so far, including a rare white-flowering tree. Cultivars include:

See also
 Metrosideros robusta, northern rātā
 Metrosideros umbellata, southern rātā
 Metrosideros bartlettii, Bartlett's rātā
 Metrosideros parkinsonii, Parkinson's rātā
 Invasive species of New Zealand origin
 Nuytsia floribunda, Australian Christmas tree
 Christmas in New Zealand

References

Further reading

External links

 
 
 Rare Metrosideros E. Alley, at Sao Miguel Island, Azores, where it grows faster and larger than in its native habitat

excelsa
Trees of New Zealand
Trees of mild maritime climate
Plants described in 1788
Endemic flora of New Zealand
Plants used in traditional Māori medicine